Gayle Bluth (19 April 1925 – 19 January 2013) was a Mexican basketball player. He competed in the men's tournament at the 1960 Summer Olympics. Bluth was also a member of the Church of Jesus Christ of Latter-day Saints, and served in the United States Navy on board a submarine.

Bluth served as president of the Argentina Bahia Blanca Mission of The Church of Jesus Christ of Latter-day Saints beginning in 1989, a position in which he succeeded Agricol Lozano.

References

1925 births
2013 deaths
Mexican men's basketball players
Olympic basketball players of Mexico
Basketball players at the 1960 Summer Olympics
Basketball players at the 1959 Pan American Games
Pan American Games competitors for Mexico
Competitors at the 1954 Central American and Caribbean Games 
Central American and Caribbean Games gold medalists for Mexico
People from Colonia Dublán
Basketball players from Chihuahua
Central American and Caribbean Games medalists in basketball
Mexican Latter Day Saints
Mexican expatriates in Argentina